The 2020–21 Japan Figure Skating Championships were held in Nagano, Nagano from December 23–27, 2020. It was the 89th edition of the event. Medals were awarded in the disciplines of men's singles, ladies' singles, and ice dance. The results were part of the Japanese selection criteria for the 2021 World Championships.

Qualifying 
Competitors either qualified at regional and sectional competitions, held from September to November 2020, or earned a bye. Skaters without a bye, but who train abroad, were awarded an exemption from the qualifiers to limit travel during the COVID-19 pandemic; the affected skaters were men's singles skater Koshiro Shimada, pair Riku Miura / Ryuichi Kihara, and ice dancers Rikako Fukase / Eichu Cho and Kana Muramoto / Daisuke Takahashi.

Medal summary

Senior

Junior

Novice

Entries 
A list of preliminary entries was published on November 25, 2020. Names with an asterisk (*) denote junior skaters.

Junior 
The top six finishers at the Japan Junior Championships in men's and ladies' singles were added to the Japan Championships. Three of the top finishers in ladies, Mao Shimada (3), Ayumi Shibayama (4), and Ami Nakai (6), were novice skaters and not eligible for the senior Championships. The seventh- through ninth-place finishers, Natsu Suzuki (7), Mone Chiba (8), and Chisato Uramatsu (9), were bumped up in their place.

Results

Men

Ladies 
Marin Honda withdrew from the competition after collapsing from dizziness prior to a morning practice session at the event.

Pairs 
On November 24, the pairs event was cancelled due to the only entry, Riku Miura / Ryuichi Kihara, facing travel difficulties in returning to Japan from their Oakville, Ontario, Canada training base.

Ice dance

Japan Junior Figure Skating Championships 
The 2020–21 Japan Junior Figure Skating Championships were held in Hachinohe, Aomori from November 21–23, 2020. There was no junior pairs competition due to the lack of entries. The national champions in men's and ladies' singles would have earned automatic berths on the 2021 World Junior Championships team, before the competition was cancelled on November 24, 2020.

Entries 
A list of preliminary entries was published on November 10, 2020. Names with an asterisk (*) denote novice skaters.

Novice 
Top finishers at the Japan Novice Championships in men's and ladies' singles were added to the Japan Junior Championships.

Schedule

Results

Junior men

Junior ladies

Junior ice dance

International team selections

World Championships 
The 2021 World Championships were held in Stockholm, Sweden from March 22–28, 2021. Japan Skating Federation announced the team on December 28, 2020.

Muramoto/Takahashi were removed as first alternates as they were unable to submit a video to the ISU to attain TES minimums.

* Pending attainment of senior TES minimums

Four Continents Championships 
The 2021 Four Continents Championships, to be held from February 9–14, 2021 in Sydney, Australia, were cancelled.

World Junior Championships 
Commonly referred to as "Junior Worlds", the 2021 World Junior Championships, scheduled to take place in Harbin, China from March 1–7, 2021, were cancelled on November 24, 2020.

References 

Japan Figure Skating Championships
Japan Championships
Figure Skating Championships